The 2020 NASCAR Hall of Fame 200 was the 22nd stock car race of the 2020 NASCAR Gander RV & Outdoors Truck Series season, the 18th iteration of the event, and the final, and therefore the cutoff race for the Round of 8. The race was held on Friday, October 30, 2020, in Martinsville, Virginia at Martinsville Speedway, a  permanent oval-shaped short track. The race took the scheduled 200 laps to complete. After a wild restart with 2 to go, Grant Enfinger of ThorSport Racing would pull away to win his 4th and final NASCAR Gander RV & Outdoors Truck Series win of the season, and his 6th career win in the series. To fill out the podium, Ben Rhodes of ThorSport Racing and Zane Smith of GMS Racing would finish 2nd and 3rd, respectively.

Background 

Martinsville Speedway is an NASCAR-owned stock car racing track located in Henry County, in Ridgeway, Virginia, just to the south of Martinsville. At 0.526 miles (0.847 km) in length, it is the shortest track in the NASCAR Cup Series. The track was also one of the first paved oval tracks in NASCAR, being built in 1947 by H. Clay Earles. It is also the only remaining race track that has been on the NASCAR circuit from its beginning in 1948.

Entry list

Starting lineup 
The starting lineup was determined by a metric qualifying system based on the results and fastest lap of the last race, the 2020 SpeedyCash.com 400. As a result, Sheldon Creed of GMS Racing won the pole.

Race results 
Stage 1 Laps: 50

Stage 2 Laps: 50

Stage 3 Laps: 100

References 

2020 NASCAR Gander RV & Outdoors Truck Series
NASCAR races at Martinsville Speedway
October 2020 sports events in the United States
2020 in sports in Virginia